U. Narayan Bhat (born 1934) is an Indian-born Mathematician, known for his contributions to queueing theory and reliability theory.

Academic career
He received a B.A. in mathematics (1953) and B.T. in education (1954) from the University of Madras, an M.A. in statistics (1958) from Karnatak University in Dharwar and Ph.D. in Mathematical statistics from the University of Western Australia on the dissertation Some Simple and Bulk Queueing Systems: A Study of Their Transient Behavior  (1965).  He worked at Michigan State University (1965–66), Case Western Reserve University (1966–69), and Southern Methodist University (1969–2005).  Bhat is a fellow of the American Statistical Association and the Institute for Operations Research and the Management Sciences and an elected
member of the International Statistical Institute.

U. Narayan Bhat was a dean of research and graduate studies at Southern Methodist University and then was named interim dean for the university's Dedman College .

Books
A Study of the Queueing Systems M/G/1 and GI/M/1, (Springer Verlag, 1968)
Elements of Applied Stochastic Processes (Wiley, 1972)
Introduction to Operations Research Models (W. B. Saunders & Co., 1977).  With L. Cooper and L. J. LeBlanc
Queueing and Related Models (Oxford University Press, 1992).  Editor with I. V. Basawa
Elements of Applied Stochastic Processes (Wiley, 2002).  With Gregory K. Miller
Introduction to queueing theory (Birkhauser, 2008)

Publications
Further Results for the Queue with Poisson Arrivals, Operations Research, Vol. 11(3), (1963), 380-386 (with Narahari Umanath Prabhu).
Imbedded Markov Chain Analysis of Single-Server Bulk Queues, Journal of the Australian Math, Soc., Vol. 4(2), (1964), 244-263.
On Single-Server Bulk Queueing Processes with Binomial Input, Operations Research, Vol. 12(4), (1964), 527-533.
On a Stochastic Process Occurring in Queueing Systems, Journal of Applied Probability, Vol. 2(2), (1965), 467-469.
Statistical Analysis of Queueing Systems in  Frontiers in Queuing by Dshalalow etc. (1997). (with G.K. Miller and S. Subba Rao).
Estimation of Renewal Processes with Unobservable Gamma or Erlang Interarrival Times, J. Stat. Plan. and Inf., 61 (1997), 355-372 (with G. K. Miller).
Maximum Likelihood Estimation for Single Server Queues from Waiting Time Data, Queueing Systems (journal), 24, (1997), 155-167 (with I. V. Basawa and R. Lund).
Estimation of the Coefficient of Variation for Unobservable Service Times in the M/G/1 Queue, Journal of Mathematical Sciences, Vol. 1, 2002 (with G. K. Miller).

References

 On Google scholar

External links
Biography of U. Narayan Bhat from the Institute for Operations Research and the Management Sciences (INFORMS)

University of Western Australia alumni
Michigan State University faculty
Case Western Reserve University faculty
Southern Methodist University faculty
Queueing theorists
Indian emigrants to the United States
Elected Members of the International Statistical Institute
1934 births
Living people
Fellows of the American Statistical Association
Fellows of the Institute for Operations Research and the Management Sciences
American Hindus
Karnatak University alumni